Pokrovskaya is a rural locality (a village) in Argunovskoye Rural Settlement of Velsky District, Arkhangelsk Oblast, Russia. The population was 70 as of 2014. There is 1 street.

Geography 
Pokrovskaya is located on the Vaga River, 10 km northeast of Velsk (the district's administrative centre) by road. Luchinskaya is the nearest rural locality.

References 

Rural localities in Velsky District